Mary O'Hara (born 12 May 1935) is an Irish soprano and harpist from County Sligo. She gained attention on both sides of the Atlantic in the late 1950s and early 1960s. Her recordings of that period influenced a generation of Irish female singers who credit O'Hara with influencing their style, among them Carmel Quinn, Mary Black, and Moya Brennan. In his autobiography Memoirs of an Irish Troubadour (2002), Liam Clancy wrote how her music inspired and influenced him and others of the Folk Revival period.

Early life and career
Mary O'Hara is the daughter of Major John Charles O'Hara, an officer in the British Corps of Royal Engineers, and his wife, Mai (née Kirwan). One of her sisters was actress Joan O'Hara, and her nephew is playwright Sebastian Barry.

O'Hara won her first competition, Sligo's annual Music and Drama singing competition, at the age of eight, and made her first radio broadcast on Radio Éireann before she left school at the age of 16. She went on to perform at Edinburgh International Fringe Festival with the Dublin University Players, BBC's Quite Contrary and The Ed Sullivan Show, before she starred in her own BBC television series. Her first recording contract was with Decca Records. Part of her extensive music career included spending a considerable amount of time on the Aran Islands collecting folk music and acquiring fluent Irish.

She was the subject of This Is Your Life in 1978 when she was surprised by Eamonn Andrews while filming at the National Motor Museum, Beaulieu.

Personal life
She was introduced to American poet Richard Selig by Irish poet Thomas Kinsella and she married Selig in 1956. She moved to the United States with him. Selig died of Hodgkin's disease 15 months after their marriage. O'Hara continued to tour and record for four years.

In 1962, she became a Benedictine nun at Stanbrook Abbey in England, where she stayed for 12 years. Her wedding band was melted down and made into a ring to celebrate her profession of solemn vows as a member of the Benedictine Order in 1967.

O'Hara's initial rise to a high-profile was repeated in 1974 when she left the monastery for the sake of her health, found that her musical reputation had grown during her time in the cloister, and returned to performing. In a matter of months, she became one of the biggest international recording stars to come out of Ireland.

The title of her autobiography, The Scent of the Roses, is taken from one of her favourite songs by Irish poet Thomas Moore. Her other books include Celebration of Love, and the coffee table book A Song for Ireland.

She continued her singing career for a further 16 years, retiring from performing in 1994. In 1985, she remarried, to Pádraig O'Toole, who was instrumental in the development of her career from 1974. They spent six years in Tanzania where her husband taught at the Tanzania School of Journalism, at the University of Dar es Salaam. A musical play about her life, Harp on the Willow by John Misto, was a great success in Australia in early 2007. Mary O'Hara completed five volumes of her harp accompaniments, and still travels, giving talks at locales such as the Yeats International Summer School, Sligo (2007), the O'Carolan Festival, Keadue, County Roscommon (2008), Northern Lights Harp Festival, Ottawa (2009), New York University (2009), and Boston College (2009). The Burns Library at Boston College houses her papers, and held a "Mary O'Hara" exhibition ending 30 April 2010.

As of 2016, O'Hara resides on the Aran Islands, off the west coast of Ireland. O'Toole died in 2015.

Influence in modern culture
O'Hara's recording of "Óró Mo Bháidín" is sampled in Passion Pit's 2008 single "Sleepyhead" and Sub Focus' song "Safe in Sound" from the album Torus.  The melody is also used in Chris de Burgh's "A Spaceman Came Travelling" as part of the chorus.

Discography

References

External links
 Official website

1935 births
Living people
Irish women singers
Irish harpists
Irish folk singers
Tradition Records artists
Decca Records artists
Musicians from County Sligo
Benedictine nuns
20th-century British Roman Catholic nuns
Former Roman Catholic religious sisters and nuns
Chrysalis Records artists
Irish-language singers